The Funiculaire de Cossonay is a funicular railway connecting the town of Cossonay in the Swiss canton of Vaud with Cossonay-Penthalaz railway station, on the line from Lausanne to Vallorbe and Yverdon-les-Bains. The lower funicular station is called Cossonay-Gare, but is in the village of Penthalaz. The line has a length of 1228 m at a maximum incline of 13%.

History 
The line was opened in 1897, and was initially operated as a water counterbalance funicular. In 1969, the line was automated, still as a water counterbalance funicular. In 1982, the line was rebuilt and converted to electric operation, with new cabins and stations.

The funicular was again completely overhauled between 2012 and 2014, reopening on June 10. At the same time, the 1982-built cabins were refurbished and repainted in its owner's green and cream. During the overhaul period, a replacement bus operated the connection.

Operation 
The Compagnie du Chemin de fer Funiculaire de la Gare à la Ville de Cossonay , after a name change in 2003 Funiculaire de la Gare à la Ville de Cossonay SA, was founded in 1892. In 2010 the company was merged into the Transports de la région Morges-Bière-Cossonay, which had assumed operation already before, but then on behalf of the original owner company. The funicular is completely automatic and has the following parameters:

See also 
 List of funicular railways
 List of funiculars in Switzerland

Gallery

References

External links 
 
 Funicular's page on Transports de la région Morges-Bière-Cossonay web site

Cossonay
Transport in the canton of Vaud
Former water-powered funicular railways converted to electricity
Railway lines opened in 1897
Metre gauge railways in Switzerland